Sheen is a measure of the reflected light (glossiness) from a paint finish.  Glossy and flat (or matte) are typical extreme levels of glossiness of a finish. Gloss paint is shiny and reflects most light in the specular (mirror-like) direction, while on flat paints most of the light diffuses in a range of angles.  The gloss level of paint can also affect its apparent colour.

Between those extremes, there are a number of intermediate gloss levels. Their common names, from the most dull to the most shiny, include matte, eggshell, satin, silk, semi-gloss and high gloss.  These terms are not standardized, and not all manufacturers use all these terms.

Terminology
Firwood, a UK paint manufacturer measures gloss as percentages of light reflected from an emitted source back into an apparatus from specified angles, ranging between 60° and 20° depending on the reflectivity. With very low gloss levels (such as matte finishes), a 60° angle is too great to measure light reflectance accurately, so a lower angle of 20° is usually used.

The returned light into the apparatus allows the gloss to be classified as follows:
 Full gloss: 70–90%
 Semi-gloss: 41–69%
 Satin: 26–40%
 Sheen: 15–25%
 Eggshell: 10–15%
 Matte: <10%

Technology

The sheen or gloss level of a paint is principally determined by the ratio of resinous, adhesive binder, which solidifies after drying, and solid, powdery pigment. The more binder the coating contains, the more regular reflection will be made from its smooth surface; conversely, with less binder, grains of pigment become exposed to the surface, scattering the light and providing matte effect.  To a lesser extent, gloss is also affected by other factors: refraction index of the pigment particles, viscosity and refraction index of the binder.

An important indicator is pigment-volume concentration (PVC), defined as the ratio of pigment volume and total paint volume:

 

PVC affects both physical and optical properties of a paint. Matte paints have less binder, which makes them more susceptible to mechanical damages (however, they are less visible than on glossy surfaces). More binder provides a smoother and more solid surface. However, at a certain PVC, called critical PVC (CPVC), the paint is already saturated with binder and the surface becomes solid and glossy, without protruding particles; adding more binder (lowering PVC) will not affect the sheen. CPVC generally depends on the binder-pigment system used, and generally falls in the 35–65% range.

As a gloss finish will reveal surface imperfections such as sanding marks, surfaces must generally be prepared more thoroughly for gloss finishes. Gloss-finish paints are generally more resistant to damage than flat paint, more resistant to staining, and easier to clean. Flat paint may become glossier through burnishing or staining with grease; glossy paint may lose its gloss and look scratched if abraded. Unlike gloss paint, flat paint can generally be touched up locally without repainting the entire surface.

Gloss level can be characterized by the angular distribution of light scattered from a surface, measured with a glossmeter, but there are various ways of measuring this, and different industries have different standards.

Applications
In traditional household interiors, walls are usually painted in flat or eggshell gloss, wooden trim (including doors and window sash) in high gloss, and ceilings almost invariably in flat. Similarly, exterior trim is usually painted with a gloss paint, while the body of the house is painted in a lower gloss.

Gloss paint is commonplace in the automotive industry for car bodies.

References

External links
PCI Magazine article: What is the Level of Confidence in Measuring Gloss?
NPL: Good practice guide for the measurement of Gloss

Interior design
Painting materials